Armadale is a Legislative Assembly electorate in the state of Western Australia. The district is named for the southeastern Perth suburb of Armadale, which falls within its borders.

History
Armadale was created at the 1982 redistribution out of parts of the seats of Dale and Gosnells. It was first contested in the 1983 election at which Labor member Bob Pearce, who had previously represented Gosnells, was successful. The seat has been regarded as very safe for the Labor Party since its creation, and at the 2001 election, the Liberal Party did not even field a candidate for the seat. It was held from 1996 until 2010 by Alannah MacTiernan, the Minister for Planning and Infrastructure in the Gallop and Carpenter governments.

On 25 June 2010, MacTiernan resigned from the Western Australian Legislative Assembly to run for the federal seat of Canning. A by-election occurred on 2 October 2010 and Labor candidate Tony Buti was elected.
Buti was re-elected at the state elections in 2013 and 2017. In the latter election, he increased his majority to 25.2 percent, making Armadale the safest seat in the legislature.

Geography
Armadale is bounded by the Tonkin Highway to the northwest, the Canning River to the northeast, and the limits of the Armadale suburban area to the south and southeast. Its boundaries include the suburbs of Armadale, Brookdale, Champion Lakes, Hilbert, Mount Nasura, Mount Richon, Seville Grove and Camillo, as well as Kelmscott west of the Canning River.

The 2007 redistribution, which took effect at the 2008 election, resulted in the seat losing eastern Kelmscott as well as Wungong and Forrestdale.

Members for Armadale

Election results

See also
 Armadale, Western Australia
 City of Armadale

References

External links
 Electorate profile (Antony Green, ABC)

Armadale